Perumbadappu is a village located in Ponnani taluk, Malappuram district, Kerala state, India. It is situated 15 kilometers south of Ponnani, bordering Thrissur district. Perumbadappu is also headquarters of one of the 15 Block Panchayats in the district and a police station. Perumbadappu is located south of Veliyankode, in the middle of Malabar Coast.

Chitrakoodam in Vanneri, Perumbadappu, was the original homeland of the Cochin rulers. When the king of Calicut annexed the region, the rulers of Permbadappu fled to Cranganore (Kodungallur). Later, they again changed their base to Cochin in the early 15th century, thus naming their state as Perumpadappu Swaroopam.

There is a Famous Mosque Perumbadappu Puthanpalli where Andu Nercha attracts thousands of pilgrims. The Nercha culminates in food distribution (neichor (ghee rice)) to all the People.

A Hospital also there named KMM Hospital located at Puthanpalli which is run and maintained by Perumpadappa, Puthanpalli Jaram Committee.

Wards of Perumbadappu
{ "type": "ExternalData",  "service": "geoshape",  "ids": "Q13113463"}
Perumbadappu Grama Panchayat is composed of the following 18 wards:

Villages in Ponnani Taluk
 Alamcode
 Maranchery
 Nannammukku

 Veliancode
Perumpadappu

Transportation
Perumpadappu village connects to other parts of India through Kuttippuram town.  National highway No.66 passes through Edappal and the northern stretch connects to Goa and Mumbai.  The southern stretch connects to Cochin and Trivandrum.   National Highway No.966 connects to Palakkad and Coimbatore.  The nearest airport is at Kozhikode.  The nearest major railway station is at Kuttippuram.guruvayur temple is only 18 km away from perumpadappu.

See also
Ponnani
Veliyankode
Edappal
Changaramkulam
Punnayurkulam
Ponnani taluk

References 

 A facebook page of Perumpadappu City, facebook page
 A Survey of Kerala History, A Sreedhara Menon (1967) Kottayam  

Cities and towns in Malappuram district
Populated coastal places in India
Kuttippuram area